According to The Authorized Roy Orbison, Lonely and Blue is the 1st music album by Roy Orbison for Monument Records, released in January 1961.

The track entitled "Come Back to Me (My Love)" features an almost identical intro to "Only the Lonely" because this is where the vocal figure of "Only the Lonely" came from.

History
After a two-year stint at Sun Records, Roy Orbison signed up with RCA Records in 1958, but left after two singles. In early 1959 Orbison's manager Wesley Rose asked producer and owner Fred Foster if he was interested in signing him for Monument Records. Foster said yes. The album was recorded at RCA Studio B using two- and three-track tape machines.

Track listing
All tracks recorded 15–17 September 1960, except where indicated.

References

Roy Orbison albums
1961 albums
Albums produced by Fred Foster
Monument Records albums